Chloé Paquet (born 1 July 1994) is a French professional tennis player. She has achieved career-high WTA rankings of No. 101 in singles on 25 April 2022 and 247 in doubles on 12 June 2017.

Career

2010–2016: WTA Tour debut
Paquet made her debut on the ITF Women's Circuit in March 2010 at the $10k tournament held in Gonesse, France; she only played the tournament's singles event, losing in the second qualifying round. She played five tournaments on the 2010 ITF Women's Circuit.

She made her WTA Tour singles debut at the WTA Premier 2011 Open GdF Suez; as a wildcard, she lost in the first qualifying round to Michaela Pochabová.

Paquet made her Grand Slam women's doubles debut at the 2014 French Open; she and her partner Alix Collombon had received a wildcard for the doubles main draw and they lost in the first round to the third-seeded Russian pair of Ekaterina Makarova and Elena Vesnina.

Her Grand Slam singles debut in qualifying came at the 2015 French Open, after receiving a singles qualifying wildcard; in the singles qualifying event, she defeated her fellow French player Lou Brouleau in the first round, before losing to Paula Kania in the second round.

Paquet participated in another Grand Slam qualifying competition after receiving again a wildcard at the 2016 French Open. She made her WTA Tour singles main draw debut at the 2016 Copa Colsanitas after winning two qualifying matches; she lost in the first round of the main draw to Anne Schäfer.

2017: Grand Slam debut at the French Open, first major match win
At the Abierto Mexicano, Paquet played just her second career WTA Tour singles main-draw match; after winning two qualifying matches, she lost in the first round of the main draw to No. 7 seed Lesia Tsurenko.

Paquet made her Grand Slam singles main-draw debut at the French Open after receiving a singles main-draw wildcard. Coming into that tournament ranked only 260th in the world in the WTA singles rankings, she upset 44th-ranked Kristýna Plíšková in the first round before losing to No. 28 seed, Caroline Garcia, in the second. Paquet's win over Plíšková was the first WTA Tour singles main-draw win of her career.

2021: Top 150 ranking
At the Australian Open, Paquet qualified for the first time in her career for a Grand Slam championship.
She received her fifth consecutive wildcard for a direct main-draw entry into the French Open. At the same major, in doubles, she reached the third round as a wildcard pair, partnering compatriot Clara Burel.

She reached a new career-high singles ranking of world No. 122, on 8 November 2021.

2022: Career-high ranking, first French Open direct entry, Wimbledon debut
She reached a new career-high of 101, on 25 April 2022, that allowed her a direct entry into the French Open after the withdrawal of Markéta Vondroušová.

Performance timelines

Only main-draw results in WTA Tour, Grand Slam tournaments, Fed Cup/Billie Jean King Cup and Olympic Games are included in win–loss records.

Singles
Current after the 2023 Australian Open.

Doubles

WTA Challenger finals

Doubles: 1 (runner–up)

ITF Circuit finals

Singles: 16 (6 titles, 10 runner–ups)

Doubles: 5 (1 title, 4 runner–ups)

Notes

References

External links
 
 

1994 births
Living people
French female tennis players
Sportspeople from Versailles, Yvelines
21st-century French women